The 1982 Tolly Cobbold Classic was the fourth edition of the professional invitational snooker tournament, which took place between 22 and 24 February 1982 at the Corn Exchange in Ipswich, England.

Steve Davis won the tournament beating Dennis Taylor 8–3 in the final.

Main draw

References

Tolly Cobbold Classic
Tolly Cobbold Classic
Tolly Cobbold Classic
Tolly Cobbold Classic